Million Dollar Arm is a 2014 American biographical sports drama film.

Million Dollar Arm may also refer to:

 Million Dollar Arm (soundtrack),  the soundtrack album of the film
 Million Dollar Arm (TV series), a 2008 Indian reality TV show